Samuel Joseph Minihan (born 16 February 1994) is an English professional footballer who plays for National League club FC Halifax Town.

Early and personal life
Minihan was born in Rochdale, Greater Manchester, and attended Bacup and Rawtenstall Grammar School. Minihan grew up in Bamford with his mum, dad and sister.

Career

Rochdale
He started his career with his local side Rochdale and signed a two-year scholarship terms in the summer of 2010. He made his professional debut for Dale on 14 April 2012, in the Football League One 3–2 victory over Exeter City. On 1 May 2012, Sam signed a two-year professional deal with the club, along with fellow youngster Luke Watson. In October 2012, he joined Conference North side Droylsden on a one-month loan deal.

In May 2013, Minihan was released from his contract and left Rochdale.

Loughborough University
From 2013 to 2015, Minihan played for Loughborough University F.C. of the Midland Football League. In 2014, he took part in a high-profile friendly against a Manchester United Youth XI. He captained a Loughborough side that went on to lose 2–0.

Worcester City
Minihan joined Worcester City of the National League North in 2015. In his first season at the club, he made thirty-four appearances for the first team, scoring one goal, and was awarded Young Player of the Season, and Player's Player of the Season.

Stockport County
On 16 June 2016, Minihan rejected an option for an extra year with Worcester and signed for Stockport County, also of the National League North, on a free transfer ten days later. The player desired to be closer to his family in the North West. After picking up the club's 2016/17 Young Player of the Year award in his first season, Minihan was rewarded with an improved two-year deal.

FC Halifax Town
On 28 July 2022, Minihan returned to the National League to join FC Halifax Town.

Career statistics

Honours
Stockport County
National League: 2021–22

References

External links

1994 births
Living people
People educated at Bacup and Rawtenstall Grammar School
Footballers from Rochdale
English footballers
Association football defenders
Rochdale A.F.C. players
Droylsden F.C. players
Worcester City F.C. players
Stockport County F.C. players
FC Halifax Town players
English Football League players
National League (English football) players